The canton of Nogent-le-Rotrou is an administrative division of the Eure-et-Loir department, northern France. Its borders were modified at the French canton reorganisation which came into effect in March 2015. Its seat is in Nogent-le-Rotrou.

It consists of the following communes:
 
Arcisses
Argenvilliers
Belhomert-Guéhouville
Champrond-en-Gâtine
Champrond-en-Perchet
Chassant
Combres
Les Corvées-les-Yys
La Croix-du-Perche
Fontaine-Simon
La Gaudaine
Happonvilliers
La Loupe
Manou
Marolles-les-Buis
Meaucé
Montireau
Montlandon
Nogent-le-Rotrou
Nonvilliers-Grandhoux
Saint-Éliph
Saintigny
Saint-Jean-Pierre-Fixte
Saint-Maurice-Saint-Germain
Saint-Victor-de-Buthon
Souancé-au-Perche
Thiron-Gardais
Trizay-Coutretot-Saint-Serge
Vaupillon
Vichères

References

Cantons of Eure-et-Loir